Sitaram Mahato Memorial College, established in 2014, is a general degree college at Anandadeep, Kuruktopa, Purulia district. It offers undergraduate courses in arts. It is affiliated to Sidho Kanho Birsha University.

Departments

Arts 

Bengali (Hons)
English(Hons)
Sanskrit(Hons)
History(Hons)
Santali(Hons)
Geography(Hons)
Political Science(Hons)
Anthropology(Hons)
Education(Gen)
Physical Education(Gen)
Philosophy(Gen)

See also

References

External links
Sitaram Mahato Memorial College
Sidho Kanho Birsha University
University Grants Commission
National Assessment and Accreditation Council

Colleges affiliated to Sidho Kanho Birsha University
Educational institutions established in 2014
Universities and colleges in Purulia district
2014 establishments in West Bengal